Timothy Francis Owen  (born 29 October 1955) is a former Australian politician and a former deputy commander of the Australian Forces in Iraq and Afghanistan. He was a member of the New South Wales Legislative Assembly representing the electoral district of Newcastle for the Liberal Party from the 2011 New South Wales state election until 6 August 2014, when he moved to the parliamentary crossbench and sat as an independent, following evidence given to the Independent Commission Against Corruption (ICAC) that he may have breached electoral funding laws.

In May 2014, Owen announced that he would not contest his seat at the next state election. On 12 August 2014, after admitting lying to ICAC, he resigned from parliament, triggering the 2014 Newcastle by-election.

Air Force career
Owen served in the Royal Australian Air Force (RAAF), commencing in 1977, and rising to the rank of Air Commodore and deputy commander of the Australian Forces in Iraq and Afghanistan. During his career in the RAAF he held various ranks and positions, including:
1984 Flight Commander, No 114 Mobile Control and Reporting Unit
1985 Three year exchange with USAF - responsible for Counter Air Tactics and Joint Battle Management courses at Tyndall AFB, completed abbreviated AWACS conversion
1990 Completed RAAF Command and Staff College
1992 Commander No 2 Control and Reporting Unit in Darwin
1995 Chief of Staff - Air Defence 41 Wing HQ
1998 Joint Air Plans, Strategic Command Division
1999 Director of Joint Plans
2000 Commander Surveillance and Control Group at RAAF Williamtown
2005 Commander Surveillance and Response Group
2007 Director General Strategic Plans Air Force
2008/9 Deputy Commander Australian Forces Iraq/Afghanistan

In 1978, Owen moved to Williamtown, the site of a large RAAF military base, and has lived in the region, when not on active duty, for 15 years. He completed a Masters in Strategic Studies (MSS) in 1999. He resigned from the Air Force and the Australian Defence Force in 2009 and became Chief Executive Officer of CI Agent Solutions, a company that provides oil-spill solutions to the defence and aerospace industry sector.

He is married to Charlotte and they live in Newcastle with three adult sons.

Political career
In October 2010 Owen joined the Liberal Party and on 11 December 2010 was endorsed as the party's candidate for Newcastle at the 2011 state election. While it was widely reported that Labor's chances were running low in the historically safe seat, it was expected that the Lord Mayor of Newcastle, John Tate, who was running as an independent candidate, was most likely to defeat Jodi McKay, the incumbent Labor member and a minister. Bookies had Owen as an outside chance to win, at odds of $5.25.

However leaked Labor Party internal polling on the eve of the election had Owen's primary support at 30 per cent, with McKay was at 25 per cent, and Tate's vote "collapsing" to 16 per cent. At the election, Owen achieved a swing of 26.9% and won the seat with 52.6% of the vote on a two party preferred basis.

McKay conceded in a statement to the press that: "The people have had their say... I accept the decision of the Newcastle community that they do not want me to continue in this role." The seat of Newcastle had been held by the Labor Party for its 84 years of existence as a single member electorate, except being held by an independent between 1988 and 1991.

In May 2014 Owen announced that would not contest his seat at the next NSW election after admitting that prohibited donors had "probably" contributed to his 2011 campaign. On 6 August 2014, the New South Wales Independent Commission Against Corruption (ICAC) revealed evidence that Owen's campaign had received illegal funding from Newcastle developers.  That evidence had been provided by Owen's campaign manager, who revealed the illicit donation scheme and his role in it in return for immunity.  The commission's counsel, Geoffrey Watson, said the funding was significant enough to call the legitimacy of Owen's victory into question.  Following this revelation, Owen resigned from the Liberal Party and moved to the parliamentary crossbench as an independent pending the result of the inquiry. On 12 August 2014, as a result of mounting political pressure, Owen resigned from parliament hours later. As an "explicit act of atonement" for the actions of Owen and others, the Liberals opted not to contest the ensuing 2014 Newcastle by-election, which saw Labor reclaim the seat. He was however subsequently not found to be corrupt in the final ICAC findings along with his other Liberal colleagues.

Honours and awards
Owen was appointed a Member of the Order of Australia (Military Division) (AM) on 26 January 2007. He received the Australian Active Service Medal and the Iraq and Afghanistan campaign medals in 2009.

References

 

Liberal Party of Australia members of the Parliament of New South Wales
Members of the New South Wales Legislative Assembly
Royal Australian Air Force officers
1955 births
Living people
Independent members of the Parliament of New South Wales
People from Brisbane
21st-century Australian politicians